Rao Saheb is a 1985 Hindi period drama film directed by Vijaya Mehta, a noted theatre director. It is based on a Marathi novel Andharachya Parambya by Jaywant Dalvi, on which he also wrote the play Barrister. The film set in small rural town in Maharashtra in early 19th century, and deals with clash of progressives and orthodox traditions, while depicting plight of women especially widows in traditional Indian society under feudalism and oppressive patriarchy. The film starred Anupam Kher, Vijaya Mehta, Nilu Phule, and Tanvi Azmi.

At the 33rd National Film Awards for 1985 films, the film won two awards; Best Supporting Actress for Vijaya Mehta, while Sham Bhutkar won the award for Best Art Direction.

Synopsis
A young barrister, Rao Saheb, returns from England after his education, and brings progressive ideas back with him. In other words, he is enamored of western ways and customs and conditioned to regard his own society as backward and repressive. He returns to his childhood home, a large mansion in small-town Maharashtra, where life goes on as placidly as it always has, quite unmoved by western ways or the officious efforts of modernists to bring about a social revolution. Rao Saheb's father is a conventional man who holds dear the values of his Brahmin caste: education, religion, tradition, austerity (frugality) and self-denial in personal life. His great tryst with modernity was to send his son, at very great expense, to England for higher education. His sister, who keeps house for him, is a childless widow of even greater orthodoxy. Mausi ("auntie"), played by Vijaya Mehta herself, is the vanguard of Brahminism at the start of the film. Radhika, a young widow who lives in a neighbouring home, is a great friend and protégée of the elderly widow. In Radhika, auntie sees the picture of her own lonely youth as a young widow, and the prospect of a lonely old age. Radhika however is inclined to rebel against the customs of austerity and self-denial which were expected of Brahmin widows at the time. Auntie, she of the unshakable orthodoxy, is torn within herself when she finds that her nephew is growing alarmingly close to the nubile young widow. As Rao Saheb begins to get closer to Radhika, empathizes with her and comes close to her, Mausi ends up as a champion of modernity and a denouncer of Brahminical values such as austerity, self-denial and the strictures of religion or tradition.

Cast

 Anupam Kher as Rao saheb
 Vijaya Mehta as Mausi
 Nilu Phule 
 Tanvi Azmi as Radhika
 Arvind Gadgil
 Chandrakant Gokhale
 Vasant Ingle 
 Mangesh Kulkarni

References

External links
 

1985 films
1985 drama films
1980s Hindi-language films
Indian drama films
Hindi-language drama films
Films set in Maharashtra
Films about widowhood in India
Films based on Indian novels
Films set in the British Raj
Films featuring a Best Supporting Actress National Film Award-winning performance
Films whose production designer won the Best Production Design National Film Award